Comalander Stadium is an 11,000-seat, open style football and soccer stadium in San Antonio, Texas.  Built as North East Stadium in 1962, it was renamed to Comalander Stadium in 2000, for long time district athletic director Jerry Comalander.  As a part of the Blossom Athletic Center, it is owned and operated by the North East Independent School District.  Along with Heroes Stadium, the stadium is the home venue for the football, track and field, and band events for the high schools and middle schools in the district. Also, the Crossmen Drum and Bugle Corps host their spring training here annually in May and June.  The playing surface was upgraded in 1998.

References

External links
Texas Bob Stadium Reference Page

North East Independent School District
Sports venues in San Antonio